This is the list of countries by stock of foreign direct investment (FDI) abroad, that is the cumulative US dollar value of all investments in foreign countries made directly by residents - primarily companies - of the home country, as of the end of the time period indicated. Direct investment excludes investment through purchase of shares.

The list is based on the CIA World Factbook data.

References

See also
List of countries by received FDI

Lists of countries by economic indicator
Foreign direct investment
Outward investment